Membrane steroid receptors (mSRs), also called extranuclear steroid receptors, are a class of cell surface receptors activated by endogenous steroids that mediate rapid, non-genomic signaling via modulation of intracellular signaling cascades. mSRs are another means besides classical nuclear steroid hormone receptors (SHRs) for steroids to mediate their biological effects. SHRs can produce slow genomic responses or rapid, non-genomic responses in the case of mSRs.

List of membrane steroid receptors
Known groups of mSRs, by ligand, include:

 Membrane sex steroid receptors
 Membrane estrogen receptors (mERs) – GPER, ER-X, ERx, Gq-mER; Nav1.2; palmitoylated nuclear receptors
 Membrane progesterone receptors (mPRs) – PAQRs (mPRα, mPRβ, mPRγ, mPRδ, mPRϵ); PGRMC1, PGRMC2;
 Membrane androgen receptors (mARs) – GPRC6A, OXER1, ZIP9; TRPM8; Cav1.2
 Membrane corticosteroid receptors
 Membrane glucocorticoid receptors (mGRs) – caveolin-associated nuclear receptors; possible unidentified receptors
 Membrane mineralocorticoid receptors (mMRs) – caveolin-associated NRs; diverse putative receptors

In addition, PDIA3 is a membrane receptor for the secosteroid calcitriol, the activated form of Vitamin D.

References

G protein-coupled receptors
Human proteins
Steroids
Human female endocrine system